NGC 403 is a lenticular galaxy located in the constellation of Pisces. It was discovered on August 29, 1862 by Heinrich d'Arrest.

See also 
 Lenticular galaxy 
 List of NGC objects (1–1000)
 Pisces (constellation)

References

External links 
 
 
 SEDS

0403
00714
04111
5368
18620829
NGC 403
NGC 403
Discoveries by Heinrich Louis d'Arrest